, TWV 21:25, is a German Singspiel in three acts by Georg Philipp Telemann performed at the Oper am Gänsemarkt in Hamburg in 1728.

The opera's overture is also played as a violin concerto in A minor.

Edition
 Georg Philipp Telemann: Die last-tragende Liebe or Emma und Eginhard, Urtext edition,

Recordings
 Selected arias: ""; ""; "" from Telemann, album by Nuria Rial (Deutsche Harmonia Mundi, 2011, Cat. No: 88697922562)

References

German-language operas
Operas
1728 operas
Operas by Georg Philipp Telemann
Opera world premieres at the Hamburg State Opera